

The Caspar C 27 was a training seaplane aircraft developed in Germany in the late 1920s.

Design and development
Two C 27s were built (Werk N. 7001, 7004).

Specifications

References

C027
Biplanes
Single-engined tractor aircraft
Aircraft first flown in 1926